The 1954 South Carolina gubernatorial election was held on November 2, 1954 to select the governor of the state of South Carolina. George Bell Timmerman won the Democratic primary and ran unopposed in the general election becoming the 105th governor of South Carolina.

Democratic primary
The South Carolina Democratic Party held their primary for governor in the summer of 1954. George Bell Timmerman was the current Lieutenant Governor of South Carolina and only faced nominal opposition in the Democratic primary.

General election
The general election was held on November 2, 1954 and George Bell Timmerman was elected the next governor of South Carolina without opposition. Turnout was much higher than the previous gubernatorial election because there was an extremely competitive Senate race on the ballot, featuring former governor Strom Thurmond.

 

|-
| 
| colspan=5 |Democratic hold
|-

See also
Governor of South Carolina
List of governors of South Carolina
South Carolina gubernatorial elections
South Carolina United States Senate election, 1954

References

"Supplemental Report of the Secretary of State to the General Assembly of South Carolina." Reports and Resolutions of South Carolina to the General Assembly of the State of South Carolina. Volume I. Columbia, South Carolina: 1955, p. 9.

External links
SCIway Biography of Governor George Bell Timmerman

1954
1954 United States gubernatorial elections
Gubernatorial
November 1954 events in the United States